Charlin or Charlins may refer to:

Charlin (name)
 Disques André Charlin, a record label founded by André Charlin
 Os Charlins, a Galician criminal gang in Spain

See also

 
 Carline (name)
 Charline (name)
 Charlene (disambiguation)
 Carlin (disambiguation)
 Carling (disambiguation)
 Karlin (disambiguation)